Sclerodactylon is a genus of plants in the grass family, native to eastern Africa and to various islands in the Indian Ocean.

Species
The only known species is Sclerodactylon macrostachyum, native to Tanzania, Mozambique, Madagascar, Comoros, Aldabra, Seychelles, and the Andaman & Nicobar Islands.

formerly included
see Acrachne 
Sclerodactylon micrandrum - Acrachne racemosa

References

Chloridoideae
Monotypic Poaceae genera